Ma Jun, may refer to:

Ma Jun (historian) (born 1953), Chinese historian.
Ma Jun (footballer) (born 1989), Chinese footballer.
Ma Jun (environmentalist) (born 1968), Chinese environmentalist.
Ma Jun (engineer) (born 1962), Chinese environmental engineer.
Ma Jun (mechanical engineer), ancient Chinese mechanical engineer.